Stojan Srdić (Cyrillic Стојан Срдић ; Glamoč 20 September 1950) is a Serbian playwright and novelist who lives in Belgrade.

References

1950 births
Living people
Serbian dramatists and playwrights
Serbian novelists